Antonio Campos (born 19 April 1951) is a Spanish steeplechase and long-distance runner. He competed in the men's 3000 metres steeplechase at the 1976 Summer Olympics.

References

External links
 

1951 births
Living people
Athletes (track and field) at the 1976 Summer Olympics
Spanish male long-distance runners
Spanish male steeplechase runners
Olympic athletes of Spain
Place of birth missing (living people)
Mediterranean Games silver medalists for Spain
Mediterranean Games medalists in athletics
Athletes (track and field) at the 1975 Mediterranean Games
20th-century Spanish people
21st-century Spanish people